The Verville Aircraft Company was a Detroit, Michigan based manufacturer of small airplanes and flying boats, which became bankrupt during the Great Depression. Alfred V. Verville started the corporation after working for multiple aviation companies. An innovative corporation, it could not survive the difficult financial crisis of the early 1930s.
The Verville Aircraft Company was located at 4815 Cabot Street, Detroit, Michigan, occupying the former Rickenbacker plant. Verville Aircraft was organized by Walter Briggs, Sr.,
president and chairman of Briggs Manufacturing Company. Barney Everett (Everitt) served as the president of the company. The treasurer was S. E. Poole.

History

First Airplane
The first dedicated passenger plane that Verville Aircraft produced was the Verville Air Coach.

After being acquired by Briggs, the manufacturer produced a light plane followed by the construction of two others.

The following designers worked for Verville Aircraft:
Louis G. Meister
Edgar A. Goff, Jr.
Peter Altman
Myron E. Zeller
Charles S. Knight (test pilot)

Insolvency

A judge in the chancery court in Wilmington, Delaware appointed a receiver for the firm in December 1931.

Aircraft
Verville Air Coach
Verville Sport Trainer AT

References

External links

Defunct aircraft manufacturers of the United States
Privately held companies based in Michigan
Defunct manufacturing companies based in Detroit
1928 establishments in Michigan
1932 disestablishments in Michigan
Verville Aircraft
Verville Aircraft